Cynoscion acoupa, the acoupa weakfish, blacktail basher or grey snapper,  is a croaker of the family Sciaenidae, found in the western Atlantic from Panama to Brazil, at depths down to 20 m.  Its length is up to 1.1 m.

References

 

Sciaenidae
Fish described in 1801